Paul Thomas is an American pornographic film actor and director. He is a member of the AVN Hall of Fame and the XRCO Hall of Fame.

Biography
Thomas was born in Winnetka, Illinois to an upper-middle-class family in 1949. His father was of Greek-Jewish descent and his mother of Russian-Jewish descent. His family moved to the nearby Village of Glencoe, Illinois where he attended Glencoe's Central School, played on the school's basketball team and graduated 8th grade in 1963. He then attended New Trier Township High School and graduated in 1967.  

Although he attended the University of Wisconsin at Madison on a basketball scholarship and studied political science, he turned to acting as a career. He is the nephew of businesswoman Sara Lee Lubin.

He began his acting career in the play Hair in both Chicago and New York. Then he appeared in the stage version of Jesus Christ Superstar on Broadway and in a touring production, where he played all the male roles except Peter. After completing the touring production, Norman Jewison cast him as Peter in his film version of Jesus Christ Superstar. He also performed in the long-running play Beach Blanket Babylon in San Francisco.

He signed with the William Morris Agency and went to Hollywood, where he appeared in a few television shows. At this point, he appeared ready to start a career in mainstream television and movie work, but instead he turned to the career for which he would become more famous.

Thomas started working in pornography in 1974. He met the porn producers the Mitchell Brothers while playing in a musical in San Francisco. He performed in several porn loops for them and, in 1976, appeared in his first porn feature, The Autobiography of a Flea.

Thomas performed mostly using the stage name "Paul Thomas", but he has also appeared under several other names. In 1982, Thomas was arrested for smuggling cocaine into the United States from South America. Convicted, he served one year in jail. Following his release from prison, Thomas resumed his career and, in 1983, won the Adult Film Association of America Award for Best Actor in Virginia. He had a starring role in the 1985 film series Taboo American Style.

Thomas started directing porn films in 1985, and has directed for Vivid Entertainment since 1986.  Thomas has acted in over 500 films and directed nearly 300 films, winning seven Adult Video News Awards and two X-Rated Critics Organization Awards for best director. He was inducted into the X-Rated Critics Organization Hall of Fame in 1986.

Thomas is a member of the Adult Video News Hall of Fame. He is a personal friend of Jennifer Ketcham, who recounts Thomas' directing style as relying heavily on aesthetics with "one-hundred-page scripts" and "deftly placed lighting" in order to create shadow effects on his performers' bodies. She also stated that Thomas would require more acting from his performers than many other directors in the industry.

Partial filmography

As actor
Jesus Christ Superstar (film) (1973)
The Autobiography of a Flea (1976)
Baby Face (1977)
Candy Stripers (1978)
Pretty Peaches (1978)
Dracula Sucks (1978)
The Ecstacy Girls (1979)
Virginia (1983)
Private Teacher (1983)
Taboo American Style (1985)
It's My Body (1985)
Debbie Does Dallas Again (2007)

As director
Justine (1984)
Beauty & the Beast 2 (1990)
Passages 1–4 (1991)
Twisted (1991)
Bad Wives (1997)
Bobby Sox (1997)
Fade to Black (2002)
Heart of Darkness (2004)
Key Party (2005)
The Masseuse (2005)
The New Devil in Miss Jones (2006)

Awards
1983 AFAA Award for Best Actor – Virginia
1991 AVN Award for Best Director – Video – Beauty & the Beast 2
1992 AVN Award – Reuben Sturman Memorial Award For Loyalty to the Adult Film Genre
1993 XRCO Award for Best Director
1994 AVN Award for Best Director, Film – Justine
1997 AVN Award for Best Director, Film – Bobby Sox
1999 XRCO Award for Best Director
2002 AVN Award for Best Non-Sex Performance – Fade to Black
2002 AVN Award for Best Director, Film – Fade to Black
2004 AVN Award for Best Director, Film – Heart of Darkness
2005 AVN Award for Best Director, Film – The Masseuse
2006 AVN Award for Best Director, Film – The New Devil in Miss Jones
2008 AVN Award for Best Director, Film – Layout
2008 XBIZ Award – Outstanding Achievement in Movie Production
2013 XBIZ Award Nomination – 'Director of the Year – Feature Release' for Friends With Benefits

Literature
Nicolas Barbano: Verdens 25 hotteste pornostjerner (Rosinante, Denmark 1999); : Features a chapter on him.

References

External links
 
 
 
 
Paul Thomas Interview 01/31/06, collider.com; accessed October 7, 2018.

Living people
Male actors from Chicago
American male pornographic film actors
American pornographic film directors
People from Winnetka, Illinois
Film directors from Illinois
Year of birth missing (living people)
Jewish American male actors
21st-century American Jews